Kuchukovo-Mayak (Kösök-Mayaq) is a rural locality (a village) in Amangildinsky Selsoviet, Uchalinsky District, Bashkortostan, Russia. The population was 135 as of 2010. There are 3 streets.

Geography 
Kuchukovo-Mayak is located 66 km southwest of Uchaly (the district's administrative centre) by road. Suramanovo is the nearest rural locality.

References 

Rural localities in Uchalinsky District